Union Avenue United Methodist Church was a historic church building in Memphis, Tennessee, that is listed on the National Register of Historic Places under the name Union Avenue Methodist Episcopal Church, South.  The building was located on a street corner at 2117 Union Avenue.

The building was no longer in use as a church when it was sold in February 2011 to CVS Pharmacy. The company paid $2.25 million for the church property and also paid $650,000 to buy an adjoining property from a different owner.  Demolition of the structure began in March 2011.

Members of the family that sold the land for church use in 1912 attempted to block the sale to CVS on the basis of a restrictive covenant in the deed that required the property to be used as a "place of divine worship."

References

Churches in Memphis, Tennessee
Churches on the National Register of Historic Places in Tennessee
Neoclassical architecture in Tennessee
Churches completed in 1914
20th-century Methodist church buildings in the United States
Buildings and structures demolished in 2011
Former churches in Tennessee
Demolished buildings and structures in Tennessee
National Register of Historic Places in Memphis, Tennessee
Former National Register of Historic Places in Tennessee
Neoclassical church buildings in the United States